is the fourth major single release from J-pop group Cute. It was released on February 27, 2008, debuting at number 6 in the Oricon Weekly Singles Chart. The single was also released as a special limited edition, featuring an additional disc containing the "Dance Shot Ver." of the music video.

Background 
A new single was scheduled to be released on January 30, 2008, but was postponed and released on February 27. The Single V was also postponed, its release been moved from February 14 to March 5.

Track listing

Charts

References

External links 
 

2008 singles
Japanese-language songs
Cute (Japanese idol group) songs
Songs written by Tsunku
Song recordings produced by Tsunku
Zetima Records singles
2008 songs